The College Editors Guild of the Philippines is an alliance of collegiate student publications in the Philippines. It is the oldest and only-existing publications alliance in the Asia-Pacific. It was established on July 25, 1931. It is also a member and a founding organization of Kabataan Partylist.

History 
The CEGP was established on July 25, 1931, on through a congregation of the editors of four college student publications: The National of National University, The Varsitarian of the University of Santo Tomas, the Philippine Collegian of the University of the Philippines, and The Guidon of Ateneo de Manila University. The guild was established in order to unite campus publications and hone their skills. It was also Ernesto Rodriguez Jr.'s, the editor-in-chief of The National, birthday that day. Wenceslao Vinzons served as its first president, from 1931 to 1932.

Its progressive roots were first noted on December 9, 1932, when Rodriguez and Vinzons led the campus journalists and the youth in opposing a bill that would grant higher salaries to members of the Lower House in the Philippines.

During the rise of the student movement in the Philippines during the 1960s, the CEGP was greatly transformed into a union of publications and journalists that linked journalism with national issues. Philippine Collegian editor-in-chief Antonio Tagamolila, as he was elected for CEGP Presidency, said that “the victory of progressives is the signal of the birth of a new, progressive College Editors Guild of the Philippines.” Then-dictator Ferdinand Marcos was able to shut down campus publications when he declared Martial Law in 1972. The likes of Tagamollila joined the underground resistance back them. However, the CEGP was reconstituted in the early 1980s.

CEGP was also part of the Second People Power Uprising.

During the early administration of President Gloria Macapagal Arroyo, a youth initiative called Youth Movement for Justice and Meaningful Change, composed of Anakbayan, League of Filipino Students, Student Christian Movement of the Philippines, CEGP, and National Union of Students of the Philippines met at the office of Anakbayan in Padre Noval, Sampaloc, Manila, to discuss plans to advance the interests of the Filipino youth. Talks were made due to the disillusionment brought by the new administration. Eventually, these talks culminated in the formation of Anak ng Bayan Youth Party (Kabataan Partylist) on June 19, 2001, coinciding with the birthday of José Rizal.

Its progressiveness has made it known for advocating press freedom. Campus Press Freedom Day in the Philippines is celebrated every July 25. CEGP is one of the groups red-tagged by the Armed Forces of the Philippines.

Notable alumni 

 Wenceslao Vinzons
 Helena Benitez
 Satur Ocampo
 Teddy Casiño

References 

Education in the Philippines
Activism in the Philippines
Student organizations in the Philippines
Youth organizations based in the Philippines